The Mohajer Technical University of Isfahan (Danushgah-e Feni-ye Mihajir-e Esfehan) is one of the higher education centers in Isfahan, Iran. The University was previously known as the Isfahan Institute of Technology and was renamed Mohajer Technical University after the 1979 Iranian Revolution. It is an independent and separated unit of the University of Isfahan, located south of the main campus and occupying 84,000 cubic meters on Hezar Jarib Boulevard. It was the first significant professional higher education center in technical major academic fields in Isfahan (and the second in the whole country) and consists almost entirely of industrial fields of study. Today Mohajer provides associate degrees in sixteen fields of study and bachelor's degrees in six.

History 

In 1967 Mohajer College started to train technicians as the Isfahan Institute of Technology. By 1972 it was called Pahlavi Technical academy of Isfahan, at which point it had 30 staff and 240 students. Those fame professional-educate-blocks are believed they were result of a contract between budget of school-building share and an Austrian contractor, Mr. Mueller. Through the Iranian Revolution and Iran–Iraq War, in 1979 it was renamed after Mohsen Mohajer (a martyr), who was studying electricity there. Finally in 2010 after a 5 year program by the Islamic Consultative Assembly, Mohajer became a university. It is affiliated with the Ministry of Science, Research and Technology rather than the Ministry of Education.

Relations 
Mohajer is very close to various international industries, such as the Mobarakeh Steel Company, Iran Electronics Industries and HESA. These industries commonly employ Mohajer students and conduct their hiring exams there.

Gallery

Faculty departments and implications

Accounting Department 
Including commercial accounting associate degree

Group of physical education 
Included is an associate degree in physical education.

Electric Institute 
Includes three groups which are:
 Department of Industrial Electrical Power
 Department of Computing
 Department of Electronics
Training courses are:
 Computer Technician
 Electronics Technician (Electrical) and Power Engineering Technology
 MB in engineering technology associate's e-mail
Side laboratories workshop are:

 Institute of Electrical & Computer

 Microscopy Laboratory pulse techniques
 Workshop TV and Radio
Computer Lab and Internet (including a computer equipped with 6 sites)
Industrial Electronics Lab Public
Lab electrical machines
 Workshop command circuit
 Workshop winding
 Joint workshops and networking
 Laboratory
Circuit Lab
Lab Contacts
 Workshop P.L.C.
 Workshop on Computer Components and Hardware
 Digital Lab
Lab Operational Amplifier
 General Electric Workshop
 Laboratory of Industrial Control

Development Institute 
Departments Institute are:
 Department of Civil Engineering
 Department of Architecture
 Department of Surveying
Courses in the Institute are:
 Associate mapping
 Building Technician (Public Works Building)
 Associate implement concrete building
 Associate Drawing Architecture
Laboratory workshop side:
 Soil Mechanics Laboratory
Concrete Lab
 Reinforcement workshop
 Welding Workshop Business Card
 Packing workshop and meter stick
 Workshop building components
 Workshop photometry
Atelier Architecture
 Operation mapping / geodesy / Photogrammetry / Cartography

Mechanics Institute 
Departments Institute are:
 Department of manufacturing
 Department of Mechanical Engineering Car
 Department of Mechanical Engineering Industries
 Department of Metallurgy (casting)
 Department of Utilities
 Department of Industrial Design
Courses in the Institute are:
 Auto Mechanic Technician
 Bachelor of Mechanical
 Associate Manufacturing and Engineering Manufacturing (ISM tools)
 Associate manufacturing (ISM molding)
 Industrial Mechanical Technician
 Associate General Drawing (Industrial Design)
 Associate facility MB in thermal plant engineering equipment
 Associate metallurgical foundry MB in engineering, metallurgy (metallurgical)
Laboratory workshop side:
 Strength of Materials Laboratory mechanical properties of metals
 Fluid Mechanics Laboratory
 Thermodynamics
Hydraulic Lab
Pneumatic Lab
 Laboratory precision measurements
 Laboratory of Heat
 Laboratory microscopes
 Analytical Chemistry Laboratories Metals
Lab and meter model
 Laboratory control systems installations
 Lab automation installations
Refrigerating thermal installations Lab
 Workshop C.N.C
 Modeling workshop
 Welding Workshop
 Modular CNC spare parts
 Auto Electrical Workshop
 Workshop adjust the steering wheel
 Workshop diesel fuel
 Workshop molding materials
 Automatic installation workshop
 Heat workshop equipment
 Workshop billets
 Refrigeration workshop
 Heat transfer workshop
 Workshop gasoline fuel
 Workshop normal power transmission
 Automatic power travel over the workshop
 Workshop perfect car navigation
 Workshop chassis and body
 Multiplex workshop
 Power generating plant
 Exhibition car mechanic

Awards 
 First place national competitions casting (Metallurgical) in 2011 and 2013.

See also 
 List of universities in Iran
 Higher education in Iran
 University of Isfahan

Resources

References 

University of Isfahan
Universities in Isfahan Province
Campuses
Isfahan